The Flag of the Anzoátegui State, is the official regional or state flag of Anzoátegui in Venezuela. The design was released on May 19, 1999 and was officially established by Decree No. 138 on June 16, 1999.

Design 
The design of the flag of Anzoátegui is composed of three horizontal stripes of equal size:
 one light blue to represent the skies, seas and rivers;
 one yellow to symbolize the warmth of the climate and its inhabitants
 one green for all the riches of our nature.

In the center of the three strips is inserted a silhouette with the shape of the state Anzoátegui, in black frame, that symbolizes the petroleum riches of the subsoil.

History 
It was the product of a competition organized expressly to conceive it on the initiative of the historian Maximilian Kopp Marcano and carried out by the Directorate of Culture of the State, under the direction of Enrique Hidalgo on February 25, 1999. The Jury, also composed of other renowned Representatives of the region, considered 152 projects being unanimously winner of the one made by Lemarys Del Valle Rincones, native of Puerto la Cruz. The definitive verdict of the contest was published on 19 May 1999 and the flag of the Anzoátegui State was officially established by Decree No. 138 signed by Alexis Rosas, Governor of the State (1998-2000) on 16 June 1999.

Anzoátegui
Flags of Venezuela